Onda Sonora: Red Hot + Lisbon is the eleventh entry in the Red Hot Benefit Series of compilation albums. The album and related television special were both created by the Red Hot Organization (RHO), an international organization whose objective in this project is to raise AIDS awareness in the Portuguese-speaking world and other places ravaged by the syndrome.

Like many epidemics, AIDS spread along major trade and travel routes. Onda Sonora, which means Sound Wave in Portuguese, features music from 40 artists representing 11 countries. The result is a fusion of elements — a collection of songs performed in seven different languages, from a variety of cultures with diverse origins and styles — all of which have been influenced by the Portuguese culture. Grammy winning music producer Andres Levin was responsible for 15 of the tracks.

The album was released two years after Red Hot + Rio, more specifically featuring music from the largest of Portugal's former colonies — Brazil.  American musician David Byrne and Brazilian musician Caetano Veloso, who were each featured in songs on the Rio album, collaborate for this album's opening track.

Featured genres 
The compilation features music from a variety of genres, which includes (but are not limited to) the following:

Alternative
Pop
Rap
Rock
Techno

Track listing
"Dreamworld: Marco De Canaveses", performed by David Byrne + Caetano Veloso – 5:05
"Dukeles", performed by Ketama + Djavan + Banda Feminina Didá – 3:50
"Mulemba Xangóla", performed by Bonga + Marisa Monte + Carlinhos Brown – 5:50
"Sobi Esse Pano, Mano", performed by General D + Funk' N' Lata – 3:32
"Nha Vida", performed by Lura – 4:40
"Coral", performed by Moreno Veloso + Sadjo Djolo Koiate – 2:16
"Fado Hilário", performed by k.d. lang – 4:42
"Os Dias São A Noite (Suso Saiz Remix)", performed by Madredeus – 4:08
"Interlude", performed by DJ Wally + Lura – 1:08
"A Mar (DJ Soul Slinger Storm Mix)", performed by Simentera + DJ Soul Slinger – 4:36
"Luz De Candeeiro", performed by Naná Vasconcelos + Vinicius Cantuária – 3:20
"Interlude: Variações Em Mi Menor", performed by António Chainho – 1:30
"Canção De Engate (In Variações Memory Remix)", performed by Delfins + Tó Ricciardi – 3:21
"O Cara Lindo (Mr. Gorgeous)", performed by Smoke City – 4:18
"Hailwa Yenge Oike Mbela (Underground Sound Of Lisbon Remix)", performed by Filipe Mukenga + Underground Sound Of Lisbon – 4:00
"Interlude", performed by DJ Spooky + Vinicius Cantuária – 0:21
"Tchon Da Na Lú", performed by Netos Do N'Gumbé – 3:29
"Sem Você", performed by Arto Lindsay + Arnaldo Antunes + Davi Moraes – 3:32
"Interlude: A Capella", performed by Salvador – 1:08
"A Névoa", performed by Paulo Bragança + Carlos Maria Trindade – 5:06
"Fado Da Adiça", performed by Filipa Pais + António Chainho – 2:44
"Babu Amgeló", performed by Ekvât – 2:45
"It's Your Life, Baby", performed by The Durutti Column – 1:31

Impact
Red Hot + Lisbon proved to be a qualified success to the RHO. The Imperio Seguradora insurance company donated $100,000 to the RHO in honor of the project, which is in addition to $500,000 dollars raised by the Red Hot + Rio project.

See also
Red Hot AIDS Benefit Series
Red Hot Organization

External links
Onda Sonora: Red Hot + Lisbon Discogs entry
Plume Noire review

Red Hot Organization albums
1998 compilation albums